The following is a list of Nippon Professional Baseball players with the last name starting with O, retired or active.

O
Thomas O'Malley
Shota Oba
Takao Obana
Sherman Obando
Koji Obata
Wes Obermueller
Keiji Obiki
Wirfin Obispo
Daisuke Ochi
Eiji Ochiai
Hiromitsu Ochiai
Alex Ochoa
Kohei Oda
Tomoyuki Oda
Masakuni Odajima
Michihiro Ogasawara
Takashi Ogasawara
Koichi Ogata
Koichi Ogata
Yoshinori Ogata
Hirofumi Ogawa
Hiroshi Ogawa (pitcher)
Hiroshi Ogawa (shortstop)
Hiroshi Ogawa (second baseman)
Koichi Ogawa
Masatoshi Ogawa
Yoshiharu Ogawa
Yusuke Ogawa
Tadahiro Ogino
Ben Oglivie
Hisashi Ogura
Shinsuke Ogura
Sadaharu Oh
Heishu Ohara
Masanori Ohashi
Toyokazu Ohba
Yasufumi Ohgai
Akira Ohgi
Seiichi Ohira
Shoji Ohiro
Daijiro Ohishi
Masayoshi Ohishi
Tomokazu Ohka
Motoi Ohkoshi
Hideaki Ohkubo
Hiromoto Ohkubo
Masanobu Ohkubo
Kevin Ohme
Noriyoshi Ohmichi
Yuta Ohmine
Takeshi Ohmori
Iwao Ohmura
Naoyuki Ohmura
Saburo Ohmura
Hiroaki Ohnishi
Masaki Ohnishi
Takayuki Ohnishi
Hisashi Ohno
Kazuya Ohno
Rin Ohno
Ryuji Ohno
Takahiro Ohno
Yuji Ohno
Yutaka Ohno
Ryosuke Ohnuki
Koji Ohnuma
Hiromi Oho
Yutaro Ohsaki
Keiji Ohsawa
Hiroyuki Oshima
Takayuki Oshima
Yasunori Ohshima
Yutaka Ohshima
Yuji Ohshiro
Hiroshi Ohshita
Makoto Ohsuga
Atori Ohta
Atsushi Ohta
Satoru Ohta
Takashi Ohta
Ryuta Ohtahara
Kan Ohtake
Ryuji Ohtani
Susumu Ohtomo
Kenji Ohtonari
Akinori Ohtsuka
Akira Ohtsuka
Jun Ohtsuka
Koji Ohtsuka
Yoshiki Ohtsuka
Koji Ohwaki
Akihiko Ohya
Takahiro Ohyama
Alvis Ojeda
Yoichi Okabayashi
Akinobu Okada
Hirokazu Okada
Takahiro Okada
Kazunori Okagami
Hideki Okajima
Akira Okamoto
Atsushi Okamoto
Hidehiro Okamoto
Isami Okamoto
Katsunori Okamoto
Koji Okamoto
Naoya Okamoto
Shinya Okamoto
Tetsuji Okamoto
Toru Okamoto
Kaoru Okazaki
Taichi Okazaki
Yoshinori Okihara
Takehiro Okumura
Curtis Olsen
Shoitsu Omatsu
Yuji Onizaki
Goh Ono
Hitoshi Ono
Kazuyoshi Ono
Kazuyuki Ono
Kosei Ono
Shingo Ono
Chikara Onodera
Hirokatsu Oohata
Rafael Orellano
Junya Orita
José Ortiz
Luis Ortiz
Ramón Ortiz
Shuichiro Osada
Katsuhito Osaka
Takehiko Oshimoto
Kenichi Oshio
Koichi Oshima
Shigeki Oto
Chris Oxspring
Kouya Oyafuso
Keiji Oyama
Tsutomu Oyama
Takao Oyamada
Yasuhiro Oyamada
Masaya Ozaki
Hiroyuki Oze
Tatsuya Ozeki

References

External links
Japanese Baseball

 O